The Battle of the Trouée de Charmes or Battle of the Mortagne was fought  at the beginning of World War I, between 24 and 26 August 1914 by the French Second Army and the German 6th Army, after the big German victory at the Battle of the Frontiers, earlier in August.

Background 

The river Meuse flows northwards from Toul to Verdun, Mézières and Givet on the Belgian border and there is a tributary of the Moselle between Belfort and Épinal, the rivers running near parallel to the 1871–1919 Franco–German border. A second series of fortifications, to prevent the main line being outflanked, was built in the south from Langres to Dijon and in the north from La Fère to Rheims, then from Valenciennes to Maubeuge, although for financial reasons these took until 1914 to complete.

Prelude

The French had suffered a crushing defeat in the Battle of Lorraine and retreated in disorder. Helmuth von Moltke the Younger, the Chief of the General Staff of the German army had a difficult choice.

Moltke decided to pursue the French and to break through the  He maintained the left wing at its full strength of 26 divisions and ordered the Bavarian 6th Army (General Rupprecht, Crown Prince of Bavaria) to attack at the junction of the French Second Army and the First Army (General Auguste Dubail).

A few hours later French aerial observers spotted the German troops and Joseph Joffre, the French Commander in Chief, directed Dubail to reinforce the Second Army with the VIII Corps.

Battle 

On 24 August, the Bavarian 6th Army began to attack in the direction of the  against the centre of the Second Army, as this was judged to be where the French were the strongest. Initially the Germans were successful and managed to take Damelevières and Gerbéviller, then pushed the French from Vacquenat Wood, Clairlieu and Censal, from where they moved towards Bayon. The Second Army was able to limit the German advance, the French 74th Infantry Regiment in particular, fighting with great tenacity. Bavarian attacks on the Flainval plateau were repulsed. To force through the gap, the 6th Army moved troops to the centre from the flanks, which Castelnau exploited by attacking the German flanks with the 71st Division (General Émile Fayolle) and they were pushed out of Erbeviller, Réméréville and Courbesseaux. The right wing of the Second Army attacked the left flank of the Bavarians and managed to take Saint-Boingt, Essey-la-Côte,  Clézentaine and Ménarmont.

During the night of  the French continued a bombardment and Castelnau concentrated the Second Army against the centre of the 6th Army. Castelnau launched an early morning attack to take Rozelieures; the attack succeeded but the Germans counter-attacked and retook Rozelieures. Castelnau attacked both German flanks with the XV Corps and XVI Corps. This had a devastating effect on the morale of the Bavarians, who had expected to be in pursuit of a defeated enemy. The Bavarian centre was kept under constant artillery fire by the French, and at  the French regained Rozelieures from the 6th Army, which suffered casualties of 2,500 men killed; on 26 August, Rupprecht ordered a retreat.

Aftermath 

The two sides regrouped and on 4 September, fought the Battle of Grand Couronné when the Germans tried to capture Nancy. The Bavarians had to abandon their effort on 13 September; the front line in Lorraine remained quiet for the next four years.

Footnotes

Sources

Further reading
Books
 
 
 
 
 
 
 

Journals

External links
 The Guns of August, by Barbara Tuchman (pp. 276–277, 433–435)
 Chtimiste : Les Batailles  de  Lorraine: 2 victoires françaises (French)
 Sambre Marne Yyser : Bataille de la Trouée de Charmes (22–26 août 1914) (French)
 Pierres Photo impressions of Lorraine

Trouee de Charmes
Trouee de Charmes
Trouee de Charmes
Trouee de Charmes
1914 in France
August 1914 events
France–Germany military relations